Jefferson Andrés Duque Montoya (born May 17, 1987) is a Colombian professional footballer who plays for Colombian club Atlético Nacional as a forward.

Honours

Club
Atlético Nacional
Categoría Primera A (4): 2013-I, 2013-II, 2014-I, 2015-II
Copa Colombia (2): 2012, 2013
Superliga Colombiana (1): 2012
Copa Libertadores da América: 2016

Individual
Categoría Primera A topscorer (1):
2015-II (15 goals)
2021-I (11 goals)
Categoría Primera B topscorer (2):
2011 (11 goals)
2012 (20 goals)

References

1987 births
Living people
Colombian footballers
Categoría Primera A players
Categoría Primera B players
Leones F.C. footballers
Deportivo Pereira footballers
Atlético Nacional footballers
Atlas F.C. footballers
Deportivo Cali footballers
Atlético Morelia players
Independiente Santa Fe footballers
Liga MX players
Footballers from Medellín
Colombian expatriate footballers
Expatriate footballers in Mexico
Colombian expatriate sportspeople in Mexico
Association football forwards